Butter-and-eggs may refer to:

 Linaria vulgaris, a species of plant native to Europe and northern Asia
 Triphysaria eriantha, a species of plant native to North America
 Butter and Egg Days Parade, held annually in Petaluma, California

See also
 Butter (disambiguation)
 Eggs-and-bacon (disambiguation)